Mount Royal is an unincorporated community and census-designated place located within East Greenwich Township in Gloucester County, New Jersey, United States. The area is served as United States Postal Service ZIP Code 08061.

As of the 2000 United States census, the population for ZIP Code Tabulation Area 08061 was 713.

Demographics

Education
East Greenwich Township School District serves grades K-6 with 7-12 served by Kingsway Regional School District.

Guardian Angels Regional School is a K-8 school that operates under the auspices of the Roman Catholic Diocese of Camden. Its PreK-3 campus is in Gibbstown while its 4-8 campus is in Paulsboro.

References

External links

 Census 2000 Fact Sheet for Zip Code Tabulation Area 08061 from the United States Census Bureau

East Greenwich Township, New Jersey
Census-designated places in Gloucester County, New Jersey
Census-designated places in New Jersey
Unincorporated communities in Gloucester County, New Jersey
Unincorporated communities in New Jersey